Allied Command Europe Highband, better known as ACE High, was a fixed service NATO radiocommunication and early warning system dating back to 1956. After extensive testing ACE High was accepted by NATO to become operational in 1964/1965.

The frequency supportability and frequency assignments were profited in accordance with the NATO Joint Civil/Military Frequency Agreement (NJFA).  The system was designed to be a combined  UHF troposcatter/microwave radio system, providing long-range communications in the form of telephone, telegraph and data traffic in the NATO chain of command.

Its combined services produced over 200 channels and equipment was in place to multiplex them to contain up to 12 different calls each. There used to be 49 troposcatter links augmented by 40 Line Of Sight Microwave terrestrial stations, located in nine different NATO countries from northern Norway through central Europe to eastern Turkey. The transmitters broadcast at 832.56 - 959.28 MHz producing an average transmitting power of 10 kilowatts.

History
NATO had been established in 1949 with then a supreme command (SHAPE) near Versailles, France, and the regional headquarters (RHQ) Allied Forces Northern Europe (AFNORTH) at Kolsås, Norway (responsible for Denmark, Norway and the UK), Allied Forces Central Europe (AFCENT) at Laffaux, France (responsible for Belgium, France, Germany and the Netherlands) and Allied Forces Southern Europe (AFSOUTH) at Naples, Italy (responsible for Italy, Greece and Turkey).  Supreme command, the three RHQ's and all subordinated units used various communication systems to establish contact: high frequency radio networks, VHF beaming transmitters and civil or military landlines. All systems had their weakness in equipment reliability; in the maximum amount of data transferred; in encryption possibilities and in unauthorized data interception. So in the early 1950s there existed an urgent need for a reliable, foolproof long distance European communications network.

US developed tropospheric diffusion techniques, integrated in a new military communications network appeared to be the solution and in 1956 STC, a planning, design, engineering and installation company had been ordered to develop a new integrated communications network in Europe. This network consisted of a number of "backbone" stations covering the  distance from the north of Norway to the south of Turkey and was initially called the "Over the Horizon Troposperic scatter Communications Net" but was renamed "Allied Command Europe - Highband" (ACE-High). The network would be kept operational until the 1990s as all frequencies then had to be released to the civilian authorities.

After all components had been installed on their locations by Marconi Electronic Systems UK, (from 1968 part of General Electric Company), in 1961 the ACE-High system had officially been transferred to NATO.

In 1966 however France, under president Charles de Gaulle, left NATO and systems had to be rerouted from France to Brunssum, Netherlands while the former Primary Control Center at Beauvais, was relocated to Lamersdorf, West-Germany.

In the early 1970s, the first geostationary satellites in the "Satellite Communication" network (SATCOM) had been activated thus expanding the ACE-High system.

The rise of the military SATCOM I-III (1971-1994), SATCOM IV (1995-now) network satellites, Internet routers, and the Central Region Integrated Communication System (CRICS) and the Crisis Response Operations in NATO Operating Systems (CRONOS) made ACE High obsolete. By the end of the 1980s, its replacement was already available but NATO postponed the ACE High phasing-out until 1995.

In 1995, the first British NATO SATCOM IV/B satellites had been activated and because the ACE-High frequencies had to be released for civil TV and mobile phone usage NATO decided to deactivate ACE-High in 1996, and the 800 MHz band frequencies became available for civilian use again.

ACE High sites

The ACE High network included the following major sites and terminals, but also connected Line of Sight (LOS) microwave links to other networks reaching C2 centres not listed here.

 AFNORTH-Norway
(NC- Senja) > NSEZ 
Pos  
TX RX Equipment:1 Scatter Line + 2 Radio Line

(nca - Höggumpen) > NHGZ 
Pos  502 m 
TX RX Equipment:1 Radio Line

(ND- Bodö) >  NKLZ 
Pos  801 m 
TX RX Equipment:2 Scatter Line + 1 Radio Line

(nda - Bodoe Tail - Kletkov) > NVAZ Pos unbekannt 
TX RX Equipment:1 Radio Line

(NE - Mosjöen) > NMOZ 
Pos  627 m 
TX RX Equipment:2 Scatter Line

(NF - Trondheim) > NSBZ 
Pos  677 m AMSL 
TX RX Equipment:2 Scatter Line + 1 Radio Line

(nfa - Trondheim Tail - Graakallen) 
Pos  543 m AMSL 
TX RX Equipment:1 Radio Line

(NG - Oslo AAA) > NSOZ 
Pos  246 m 
TX RX Equipment:2 Scatter Line + 1 Radio Line

(Oslo YYY - Svartas) > NVAZ 
Pos  
TX RX Equipment:3 Radio Line

(nga - Oslo Tail 01 - Kolsaas) > NKOZ 
Pos  
TX RX Equipment:1 Radio Line

(ngb - Oslo Tail 02 - Maakeroy) > NVEZ 
Pos  14  m 
TX RX Equipment:1 Radio Line

(NH - Grimstad - Stormyrheia/hørte) > NSMZ 
Pos  326 m 
TX Rx Equipment:3 Scatter Line

(NJ - Sola - Lysenut) > NLYZ 
Pos  792 m 
TX RX Equipment:2 Scatter Line

 AFNORTH-Denmark
(DA - Karup - Torphøj) > DTOZ 
Pos  135  m 
TX RX Equipment:2 Scatter Line + 1 Radio Line

(daa - Karup Tail - Lundbakke) > DLUZ 
Pos  68  m 
TX RX Equipment:1 Radio Line

AFNORTH-United Kingdom
(EAA - Faroes - Sandfelli 2)
(EA - Shetlands - Mossy Hill) > UMSZ - Mossy Hill >  227 m AMSL
(eab - Shetlands Tail Relay - Collofirth Hill) > UCOZ - Collafirth Hill >  239 m AMSL
(eac - Shetlands Tail - Saxa Vord) USVZ - Saxa Vord  276 m AMSL
(EB - Aberdeen - Mormond Hill) > UMOZ - Mormond Hill  227 m AMSL
(eba - Aberdeen Tail - Long Haven Hill) > UBUZ - Long Haven Hill  95 m AMSL
(EC - Boulmer - Brizlee Wood) > UBOZ - Brizlee Wood  250 m AMSL
(ED - Binbrook - Stenigot) > UBIZ - Stenigot   153 m AMSL
(EE - London - Coldblow Lane) > UMAZ - Coldblow Lane   194 m AMSL
(eeb - London Tail Relay - Woldingham - RAF Botley Hill Farm)
(eea - London tail - Hillingdon)
RAF Uxbridge – local terminus

AFCENT-France
 (FAN - Paris - Mont Florentin)  FFLZ - Paris North   222 m AMSL
 FTAZ - Taverny   178 m AMSL
 (fac - Paris Tail (2)- Sant Germain)   71 m AMSL
 (fae - Paris Tail (2) - Extension (SHAPE)   178 m AMSL
 (fa - Relais Paris - Emeville)  FEMZ - Emeville   247 m AMSL
 (faa - Paris Tail (1) - Laffaux)   143 m AMSL
 (fad - Relay Paris - Rozoy Bellevalle)  FRBZ - Rozoy Bellevalle   219 m AMSL
 (FAS - Paris - Mont Aout)  FAOZ - Paris South   216 m AMSL
 (FA - Trier - Rohrbach)  FROZ - Rohrbach   376 m AMSL
 (fay - Trier Tail - Kindsbach)  ABHZ - Kindsbach   458 m AMSL
 (FC - Lyon - Pierre sur Haute) FLYZ - Lyon  45|39|11.52|N|03|48|33.07|E|type:landmark}} 1632 m AMSL
 (FD - Nice - Signal de la Chens)  FNIZ - Nice   1703 m AMSL

AFCENT-Netherlands
HBRZ - Brunssum  95 m AMSL TX equipment 1S + 1R
HMAZ - Maastricht  82 m AMSL TX equipment 1S +2R

AFCENT-Belgium
BADZ - Adinkerke
BCAZ - Casteau  Supreme HQ Allied Powers Europe Pos  87 m AMSL TX Equipment 2S +2R
BCHZ - Chievres Pos   TX Equipment 2S +2R
BFRZ - Baraque de Fraiture  654 m AMSL TX Equipment 3R

AFCENT-Germany
ABHZ - Kindsbach  458 m ü. NN
(AA - Emden - Aurich) AEMZ - Aurich  10 m ü. NN
(AB - Moenchengladbach - Roetgen) ALAZ -Lammersdorf  593 m ü. NN
(abb - Moenchengladbach Tail (1) - Hehn) AHEZ - Hehn  81 m ü. NN
(aba - Moenchengladbach Tail (2) - Millen)  151 m ü. NN
(abc - Uedem) AUEZ - Uedem  47 m ü. NN
AFEZ - Feldberg  1458 m ü. NN

AFSOUTH-Italy
 IDGZ - Dosso dei Galli   2174 m AMSL
 IVTZ - Verona Tail ( im West Star Bunker )   334 m AMSL
 (IA - Livorno - Monte Giogo)  IMXZ - Livorno   1496 m AMSL
 (IAZ - Cavriana - Monte Bosco Scuro)  IMBZ - Cavriana   189 m AMSL
 (iaa - Verona Torre 4)   164 m AMSL
 (IAY - Lame - Cavanella)  ICEZ - Lame Concordia   7 m AMSL
 (iax - Aviano)  IAVZ - Aviano   99 m AMSL
 (IB - Rome - Tolfa)  ITLZ - Rome   621 m AMSL
 (iba - Rome Tail - Monte Cavo)  IMCZ - Monte Cavo   930 m AMSL
 (IC - Naples - Ischia - Punta Fetto)  IICZ - Naples   639 m AMSL
 (ica - Naples Tail - Monte Pecorara)  IPEZ - Monte Petrino   335 m AMSL
 (icy - Monte Vergine) IMNZ - Monte Nardello   1516 m AMSL
 (icz - Monte Vulture)  IVUZ - Monte Vulture   1301 m AMSL
 (icv - Monte Iacontenente) IIAZ - Monte Iacontenente 
 (icf - Pietra Ficcata)  IPFZ - Pietra Ficcata   586 m AMSL
 (icw - Martina Franca)  IAMZ - Martina Franca 
 (ID - Catanzaro - Monte Mancuso)  IMMZ - Catanzaro   1319 m AMSL
 (IDA - Monte Lauro - Cozzo tre Grotte)  ICCZ - Monte Lauro  944 m AMSL

 AFSOUTH-Malta
 (idb - Malta - Gharghur)  IDBZ - Malta - Gharghur

 AFSOUTH-Greece
(GA - Kefallina) > GKFZ - Kefallonia  1001 m AMSL
(GB - Athens - Pendelikon) > GPKZ - Athens  1038 m AMSL
(GBZ - Crete - Ziros) > GZIZ - Ziros  786 m AMSL
(GBY - Larissa - Phillon) > GPIZ - Phillon  1513 m AMSL
(GBW - Vitsi) > GVIZ - Vitzi  2009 m AMSL
(GBV - Ismaros) > GISZ - Ismaros  612 m AMSL

AFSOUTH-Turkey
(TA - Izmir - Bespinar Tepes) > TBPZ - Izmir - Bespinar Tepes  964 m AMSL
(taa - Izmir Tail) > TKYZ - Izmir Tail
(TB - Eskisehir) > TKUZ - Eskishir - Kutahya Dagi  1820 m AMSL
(tba - Eskirsehir Tail) > TESZ - Eskirsehir Tail
(TC - Ankara) > TEDZ - Ankara - Elan Dagi  1856 m AMSL
(TCK - Merzifon) > TKJZ - Merzifon
(TCW - Persembe) > TPEZ - Persembe
(TCV - Pazar) > TPAZ - Pazar 
(TD - Siwas - Pinarbasi) > TPIZ - Pinarbasi  2285 m AMSL
(TG - Adana) > TDDZ - Davudi Dağı  515 m AMSL
(tga - Adana Tail) > TDAZ - Adana Tail
(TE - Dyarbakir - Karaka Dagi) > TDIZ > Dyarbakir - Karaka Dagi(tea - Dyarbakir Tail) > TDEZ - Dyarbakir TailBloatli, Turkey

AFSOUTH-Cyprus
(TCZ - Cap Greco) > JCGZ -Cavo Greko'''   62 m AMSL

Equipment used

Initially 60, 30 or 15 ft dish or billboard type antennas have been used in combination with General Electric or RCA AN/MRC80 TRC24; AN/FRC-75 or 39 radio sets. Later being replaced by newer Siemens & Halske EM 120/400 and 12/800 types. The type and beaming angle of the antennas depended of the local site position and its distance to the next relays.

See also
Radio propagation
Tropospheric scatter
Microwave
White Alice Communications System - Cold war era Alaskan tropospheric communications link
List of White Alice Communications System sites
List of DEW Line Sites
Distant Early Warning Line

References

External links
History and details
Photographs of an installation
Troposcatter communication network maps
Website by Gerrit Padberg and Roger Camperi
Italian Website

Telecommunications equipment of the Cold War
Military radio systems
1956 introductions
NATO installations in the United Kingdom
NATO installations in Germany
NATO installations in Norway
NATO installations in Italy
NATO installations in Belgium
Cold War military equipment of the United Kingdom
1956 in international relations
Highband
Tropospheric scatter systems